Penchal is an Oceanic language of Manus Province, Papua New Guinea.

References

External links 
 Kaipuleohone has archived audio recordings and written materials on Penchal

Admiralty Islands languages
Languages of Manus Province